Jackson Township is one of seventeen townships in Boone County, Iowa, USA.  As of the 2000 census, its population was 582.

History
Jackson Township was established in 1857.

Geography
According to the USGS, it contains one cemetery, Mitchell.

References

External links
 US-Counties.com
 City-Data.com

Townships in Boone County, Iowa
Townships in Iowa
1857 establishments in Iowa
Populated places established in 1857